The Huaylas District is the smallest of 10 districts of the Huaylas Province in the Ancash Region of Peru. The capital of the district is the village of Huaylas.

Location
The district is located in the north-western part of the province at an elevation of 2,721m. The village of Huaylas is located 45 km from the city of Caraz.

Populated places
Populated places in the district with the number of households in parenthesis.
 Waylas (502)
 Itakuq Punta (11)
 Waras Calle (31)
 Shuyu (199)
 Delicados (25)
 Yakup (192)
 Llima (2)
 Waruma Pukyu (12)
 Wanwamachi (4)
 Wamanyaku (30)
 Ñawinyaku (23)

Capital
The capital of the district is the village of Huaylas.

References

External links
  Official website of the Huaylas province
  Official website of the Huaylas district

Districts of the Huaylas Province
Districts of the Ancash Region